Alfred "Big Al" Delvecchio is a character on the U.S. sitcom Happy Days. He was played by Al Molinaro. Molinaro joined the cast in Season 4 after Pat Morita, who played Arnold, left after the end of the third season (in the last episode "Arnold Gets Married"). Subsequently Molinaro also played Al's twin brother priest Father Anthony Delvecchio. Al said that he also had a brother who worked at the sanitation department.

Fictional character biography
Al Delvecchio was the drive-in owner and cook of Arnold's Diner from season 4 to season 9. Al eventually married Chachi's mother, Louisa. He had a sighing catchphrase of "Yep-yep-yep...".

For much of the series Al would talk about his former love Rosa Coletti and how she left him for a tie salesman. Eventually Al would meet Rosa again in the eighth season episode, "If You Knew Rosa". She was played by Nancy Marvy.

Other media
Al Molinaro as Al Delvecchio made a cameo appearance in the 1995 Weezer music video for their single "Buddy Holly", where the band were portrayed as playing at Arnold's. Molinaro was the only cast member from the show to record new content for the music video as the rest were edited in through archival footage.  The character also made an appearance on the Robot Chicken episode "Celebutard Mountain", but was voiced by Adam Talbot. He also appeared on Family Guy on a stained glass window in the church of "The Holy Fonz" on the episode "The Father, the Son, and the Holy Fonz".

References

Happy Days characters
Fictional twins
Fictional chefs
Television characters introduced in 1976
Fictional Italian American people
Fictional characters from Wisconsin